Amos Fortune (c. 1710 – November 1801) was a prominent African-American citizen of Jaffrey, New Hampshire in the 18th century. Fortune was born in Africa and brought to America as a slave. He purchased his freedom at the age of 60 and moved to Jaffrey to start a leather tannery business. Documents now archived at the Jaffrey Public Library testify to his literacy, community position, and financial success.

Purchase of freedom
The first record of Amos Fortune is an unsigned "freedom paper" dated December 30, 1763. In it Fortune's owner, Ichabod Richardson, a "tanner of Woburn, in the province of Massachusetts-bay in New England" outlines an agreement with Fortune that at the end of four years Amos would be "Discharged, Freed, and Set at Liberty from my service power & Command for ever...." When Richardson died unexpectedly in 1768, his will contained no mention of Fortune's freedom. Fortune then negotiated with Richardson's heirs to "pay off his bond." He made the last payment in 1770 and subsequently purchased his freedom.

After purchasing his freedom, Fortune continued to live and work in Woburn. He bought land and built a house with help from his first mistress's family. His wife, Lily Twombly—whom he purchased for twenty pounds from Josiah Bowers of Billerica—died within that year, 1775. On November 9, 1779, Fortune purchased the freedom of a woman named Violet (also spelled Violate, including on her tombstone) from James Baldwin. They were married the next day in Woburn. Violate and Amos adopted a daughter, Celyndia, after they were married.

Life in Jaffrey
In 1781, Fortune moved to Jaffrey to establish himself as a tanner. His first home and tannery were at the foot of a hill west of what is now the Jaffrey Center Common (located in the Jaffrey Center Historic District) on land set aside for a yet-to-be-named minister. A year later, Laban Ainsworth was called to be Jaffrey's first minister. Fortune remained on the property and the two men appear to have become friends.

In 1789, Fortune purchased 25 acres (100,000 m2) at another location on Tyler Brook. The house and barn which he built are still standing in their original location. The road the house is on is now called Amos Fortune Road.

Fortune's tannery appears to have prospered. He took on at least two apprentices and served clients in Massachusetts in addition to nearby New Hampshire towns. He became a full member of the First Church. Additionally, though a former slave, Fortune was a literate man. In 1797, he was a leading founder in the establishment of the Social Library, the town's first library. Years later, he was commissioned by this library to rebind a collection of books.

Death
Fortune died in January 1801, at the age of 91. He is buried behind the Jaffrey Meetinghouse in the Old Burying Ground. The inventory of his estate testifies to his  prosperity. Among the items listed are silver shoe buckles, a silver watch, and a fur coat. Many of the items were sold and, due to the precise details documented, we known it amounted to the quantity of $770.20. Fortune instructed his executor, Eleazer, to have "hand stones" erected to his wife and himself and to make a "handsome present" to the church. The remaining money was given to the town to support Schoolhouse Number 7. This last bequest has evolved into the Amos Fortune Fund and has supported diverse projects including public speaking contests and special publications. The Jaffrey Public Library now administers the Fund, using the income to develop and distribute educational materials on Amos Fortune.

Violate Fortune died in 1802, one year after her husband, and was buried next to him. Their epitaphs were written by the Reverend Laban Ainsworth:

Legacy
Elizabeth Yates wrote a Newbery Medal winning biographical novel entitled Amos Fortune, Free Man in 1950.

Fortune is featured on a New Hampshire historical marker (number 13) along New Hampshire Route 124 in Jaffrey.

A 1997 short film by Matthew Buckingham, Amos Fortune Road, meditates on the scantness and fragility of the surviving historical record regarding Amos Fortune.

F. Alexander Magoun's 1964 novel Amos Fortune's Choice gives a fictional biography of Fortune's life.

Amos Fortune Day was celebrated, and created for, February 20, 1955. Governor Lane Dwinnel of New Hampshire created this holiday.

See also
List of enslaved people

References

External links

1710 births
1801 deaths
African-American businesspeople
18th-century American businesspeople
American people of Ghanaian descent
18th-century American slaves
People from Jaffrey, New Hampshire